Hubberd is a surname. Notable people with the surname include:

Edward Hubberd (died 1602), Member of the Parliament of England
Mother Hubberd of Mother Hubberd's Tale

See also
Hubbard (surname)
Hubbert